Wallis Grahn (13 February 1945 – 18 January 2018) was a Swedish actress.

Biography
Grahn grew up in a working-class family, something she considered to be significant for her work as an actress. She went to Stockholm's music classes and Adolf Fredrik's Music School. She initially planned to become a writer or journalist but was persuaded by Per Ragnar to seek a theater education at Marieborg Folk High School in Norrköping in 1964. In 1965 she joined the Marionette Theater in Stockholm, and from 1967 to 1970 she studied at the Scenen School in Malmö. Between 1980 and 2005, Grahn worked as an actress at Malmö City Theater.

In addition to the theater, Grahn was an actor in film and television. In 1974, she played in Jan Halldoff's The Last Adventure. That same year she played Vera in the play Jösses Flickor befrielsen är nära, directed by Suzanne Osten, and also participated in the play's soundtrack recording. Osten wrote the role of the movie guard in her debut film Mamma (1982) especially for Grahn.

Grahn also had roles in The Simple-Minded Murderer, Night of the Orangutan, Babels hus, Eva & Adam, Svenska Slut, Goltuppen, Morrhår och ärtor, Rederiet, and Henning Mankell's The Fifth Woman.

Grahn died in Stockholm, at the age of 72.

Selected filmography
1977 – Mackan
1981 – Babels hus (TV)
1981 – Pelle Svanslös
1981 – The Simple-Minded Murder
1982 – Profitörerna (TV)
1984 – 
1986 – Anmäld försvunnen (TV)
1986 – Morrhår och ärtor
1989 – 1939
1992–93 – Rederiet (TV)
1993 – Roseanna
1995 – Torntuppen (TV)
1996 – Att stjäla en tjuv
1999 – Eva & Adam (TV)
2002 – Den 5:e kvinnan
2002 – Svenska Slut (TV)
2003 – The Man Who Smiled
2005 – Wallander – Innan frosten
2006 – LasseMajas detektivbyrå (TV series)
2009 – Andra Avenyn (TV)
2009 – Wallander – Skulden

References

External links

1945 births
2018 deaths
Swedish actresses
Actresses from Stockholm